Kunzea baxteri, commonly known as scarlet kunzea, is a flowering plant in the myrtle family Myrtaceae, and is endemic to the south-west of Western Australia where it occurs near granite outcrops and hills. It is a shrub with large, scarlet, bottlebrush-like flower clusters, making it popular as a garden feature.

Description

The clusters usually contain between 16 and 30 flowers on the ends of branches which continue to grow during the flowering period. Flowering is most prolific from July to September but often occurs as late as March, depending on rainfall. The fruit release the seeds when mature, unlike many others in the Myrtaceae. The features of this species that distinguish it from others in the Myrtaceae are the red flowers, persistent sepals and deciduous fruit. The oblong leaves and narrow sepals distinguish it from Kunzea pulchella which also has red flowers.

Taxonomy and naming
The species was first formally described in 1836 by Johann Klotzsch, who gave it the name Pentagonaster baxteri and published the description in Allgemeine Gartenzeitung. In 1844, Johannes Conrad Schauer revised the name to Kunzea baxteri. The specific epithet (baxteri) honours William Baxter, an English gardener who collected seeds and plants for British nurserymen.

Distribution and habitat
Kunzea baxteri grows in coarse sandy soil or laterite, often near granite outcrops in heath, scrub or woodland.

Ecology
Scarlet kunzea is pollinated by honeyeaters and mammals which are attracted to its large red flowers.

Conservation
Kunzea baxteri is classified as "not threatened" by the Western Australian Government Department of Parks and Wildlife.

Use in horticulture

This kunzea has been grown in gardens for many years. It is best suited to a climate with dry summers and wet winters. It is, however, adaptable to more humid areas and those with moderate frosts but requires a sunny or partly-shaded area with well-drained soil. In has been grown from cuttings on Kunzea ambigua rootstock.

References

baxteri
Endemic flora of Western Australia
Myrtales of Australia
Rosids of Western Australia
Plants described in 1836